Raahe-Pattijoki Airfield  is an airfield in Raahe, Finland, about  east of Raahe town centre.

See also
List of airports in Finland

References

External links
 VFR Suomi/Finland – Raahe-Pattijoki Airfield
 Lentopaikat.net – Raahe-Pattijoki Airfield 

Airports in Finland
Airfield
Buildings and structures in North Ostrobothnia